Jeanine Emelie Marcelle Touchard-Vapaille (25 November 1924 – 23 December 2005) was a French gymnast. She competed in the women's artistic team all-around at the 1948 Summer Olympics.

References

1924 births
2005 deaths
French female artistic gymnasts
Olympic gymnasts of France
Gymnasts at the 1948 Summer Olympics
20th-century French women